Dormaa District is a former district that was located in Brong-Ahafo Region (now currently in Bono Region), Ghana. Originally created as an ordinary district assembly on 10 March 1989. However, on 1 November 2007 (effective 29 February 2008), it was split off into two new districts by a decree of president John Agyekum Kufuor: Dormaa Central District (which it was elevated to municipal district assembly status on 28 June 2012; capital: Dormaa Ahenkro) and Dormaa East District (capital: Wamfie). The district assembly was located in the western part of Brong-Ahafo Region (now southwest part of Bono Region) and had Dormaa Ahenkro as its capital town.

References

Districts of Bono Region